Union Pacific Rail may refer to:

Union Pacific Corporation, holding company that owns the Union Pacific Railroad
Union Pacific Railroad